Sinner is the eleventh studio album by the American hard rock band Joan Jett and the Blackhearts, released June 13, 2006, by Blackheart Records Group. While most of the contents previously appeared on the Japan-only release Naked (2004), some in different mixes, it is her first record of new material released in the United States since Pure and Simple in 1994. Singles released include "A.C.D.C." (originally by Sweet) and "Riddles" (Jett's first-ever political song), which is a new version of "Right in the Middle" from Naked with different lyrics.

An edited "clean" version was also released. The CD also includes enhanced content, consisting of a lyrics sheet (in PDF format) and a video of the recording of "A.C.D.C.".

Track listing

Personnel

The Blackhearts
Joan Jett - rhythm guitar, lead vocals 
Dougie Needles	- lead guitar, backing vocals
Enzo Penizzotto - bass, backing vocals
Thommy Price - drums
Kenny Laguna - keyboards, backing vocals

Production
Mike Scielzi - engineer at Soundtrack Studios
Billy Crater, Craig Snyder, Thom Panunzio - additional engineering
Greg Calbi - mastering at Sterling Sound, New York

References

Joan Jett albums
2006 albums
Albums produced by Ted Templeman
Blackheart Records albums
Albums produced by Joan Jett